Laguna West-Lakeside is an area located on the west side of the city of Elk Grove in Sacramento County, California.  Formally a census-designated place (CDP), Laguna West-Lakeside was annexed by Elk Grove in 2003. The population of Laguna West-Lakeside was 8,414 at the 2000 census, before annexation.

Geography

Demographics
As of the census of 2000, there were 8,414 people, 3,032 households, and 2,277 families residing in the CDP. The population density was 3,971.3 inhabitants per square mile (1,532.4/km2). The racial makeup of the CDP was 54.43% White, 10.42% African American, 0.32% Native American, 20.99% Asian, 0.45% Pacific Islander, 5.23% from other races, and 8.15% from two or more races. Hispanic or Latino of any race were 13.20% of the population.

In the 3,032 households in the 2000 census, 43.8% had children under the age of 18, 64.4% were married couples living together, 7.3% had a female householder with no husband present, and 24.9% were non-families; 17.9% of the households were made up of individuals, and 3.9% had someone living alone who was 65 years of age or older.  The average household size was 2.78 and the average family size was 3.20.

In the CDP, the population was spread out, with 29.0% under the age of 18, 5.4% from 18 to 24, 43.3% from 25 to 44, 16.9% from 45 to 64, and 5.3% who were 65 years of age or older.  The median age was 33 years. For every 100 females, there were 92.5 males.  For every 100 females age 18 and over, there were 88.3 males.

The median income for a household in the CDP was $76,404, and the median income for a family was $82,992. Males had a median income of $56,078 versus $43,341 for females. The per capita income for the CDP was $30,272.  About 3.1% of families and 3.8% of the population were below the poverty line, including 4.0% of those under age 18 and 4.1% of those age 65 or over.

Laguna West - a Master Planned Community

Design
Laguna West was designed by Peter Calthorpe and using New Urbanism principles.  Design features in Laguna West include features such as the following:
Pedestrian friendly neighborhoods that encourage walking
A town center
A nature/riparian zone
Houses that have small front yards and driveways that are short or behind the house, use of alleyways.
Streets that are designed to create calm and encourage slow driving by creating narrower streets or putting tree planter boxes on one side of the street, to discourage high speed thoroughfare-type driving.
Each house was to have two trees—there would be 20 species of disease- and drought-resistant trees, one species to each block. This planting plan was expected eventually to provide a continuous canopy of shade.

The first of about 3,400 planned homes were built in 1991 in the 1,000-acre (1.5625 mi2) subdivision, according to one report.

Development
Developer and, later, politician Phil Angelides includes the town of Laguna West amongst his ventures. From his 2010 Apollo Alliance biography: "In the 1980s, [Angelides] pioneered the planning and building of smart growth communities long before the concepts of sustainability were embraced by the marketplace ... and sparked a national dialogue around building more livable, environmentally responsible communities."

Comment on design and achievement
Urbanist Sir Peter Hall, who hailed Calthorpe's plans in a 1994 paper, was quoted in 2005 as suggesting that "the development fails the sustainability test because it is not served by public transportation and is as completely car dependent as any other suburb." It appears that light rail links were originally expected, but the planned extension of Sacramento's Blue Line will now apparently veer east towards Elk Grove at a point some 2 to 3 miles to the north of Laguna West; the community, as of summer 2007, is only served by an hourly bus service

Politics
In the state legislature, Laguna West-Lakeside is in the 5th Senate District, represented by Democrat Lois Wolk, and in the 10th and 15th Assembly Districts, represented by Democrats Alyson Huber and Joan Buchanan respectively.

References

External links
Ground Photos At Calthorpe Associates redesigned Web site, "the page you are looking for no longer exists"; Laguna Park not amongst eleven "Community Design" listings on Web site; "Sacramento County General Plan and Guildelines" covers region. Researched 2010-01-13.
Article criticising Laguna West's lack of success in achieving its New Urbanism aims Link not active at www.capitolweekly.net; no article in archive with words "Laguna West New Urbanism" in body of article. Researched 2010-01-13.

Elk Grove, California
Former census-designated places in California
New Urbanism communities
Planned cities in the United States
Populated places established in 1991
1991 establishments in California